Wat Mai Suwannaphumaham often simply Wat Mai or Wat May is a Buddhist temple or wat in Luang Prabang, Laos. Built at the turn of the 18th century, it is the largest temple in Luang Prabang.

Gallery

References

Buddhist temples in Laos
Buildings and structures in Luang Prabang
18th-century Buddhist temples